The 1990 GM Goodwrench 500 was the third stock car race of the 1990 NASCAR Winston Cup Series season and the 25th iteration of the event. The race was held on Sunday, March 4, 1990, before an audience of 52,700 in Rockingham, North Carolina, at North Carolina Speedway, a  permanent high-banked racetrack. At race's end, SABCO Racing driver Kyle Petty would manage to dominate a majority of the race to take his third career NASCAR Winston Cup Series victory and his only victory of the season. To fill out the top three, Junior Johnson & Associates driver Geoff Bodine and Hendrick Motorsports driver Ken Schrader would finish second and third, respectively.

Terri O'Connell, driving a second car for Donlavey Racing, is credited with being the only openly transgender driver to ever race in the NASCAR Winston Cup Series to date, finishing last in a 38-car field.

Background 

North Carolina Motor Speedway was opened as a flat, one-mile oval on October 31, 1965. In 1969, the track was extensively reconfigured to a high-banked, D-shaped oval just over one mile in length. In 1997, North Carolina Motor Speedway merged with Penske Motorsports, and was renamed North Carolina Speedway. Shortly thereafter, the infield was reconfigured, and competition on the infield road course, mostly by the SCCA, was discontinued. Currently, the track is home to the Fast Track High Performance Driving School.

Entry list 

 (R) denotes rookie driver.

Qualifying 
Qualifying was originally scheduled to be split into two rounds. The first round was held on Thursday, March 1, at 2:30 PM EST. Originally, the first 20 positions were going to be determined by first round qualifying, with positions 21-40 meant to be determined the following day on Friday, March 2. However, due to rain, the second round was cancelled. As a result, the rest of the starting lineup was set using the results from the first round. Depending on who needed it, a select amount of positions were given to cars who had not otherwise qualified but were high enough in owner's points; up to two were given.

No drivers would fail to qualify.

Full qualifying results

Race results

Standings after the race 

Drivers' Championship standings

Note: Only the first 10 positions are included for the driver standings.

Notes

References 

1990 NASCAR Winston Cup Series
March 1990 sports events in the United States
1990 in sports in North Carolina
NASCAR races at Rockingham Speedway